Raphael Zuber (born 5 June 1973 in Chur) is a Swiss architect.

Biography 
Raphael Zuber studied at ETH Zurich until 2001 and practiced with Valerio Olgiati in Zurich. After graduating, he founded an architectural office in Chur. Zuber taught at the Accademia di Architettura di Mendrisio, the Oslo School of Architecture and Design, the EPF Lausanne, the ETH Zurich and at the Cornell University Ithaca.  Raphael Zuber was invited by Alejandro Aravena to the Venice Biennale of Architecture in 2016, where he showed four of his most recent projects.

Principal works 

 2007–2011: schoolhouse, Grono with Conzett Bronzini Gartmann and Maurus Schifferli
 2005–2016: apartment building Fravi, Domat/Ems with Patrick Gartmann
 2015–2016: inverted house, Hokkaido with the Oslo School of Architecture and Design and Kengo Kuma and Associates 
 2018–2023: house at the Black Sea with Laura Cristea
 2018–2025: public swimmingpool, Gossau with Patrick Gartmann and Maurus Schifferli

Awards
 2012: Architecture and engineering prize for earthquake-proof construction for schoolhouse Grono
 2013: Auszeichnungen für gute Bauten Graubünden for schoolhouse Grono
 2018: Recognition award from the city of Chur

Literature 
 Important Buildings. Istituto Svizzero di Roma, Kaleidoscope Press, Milano 2010 
 Important Buildings. A personal choice made by students with Raphael Zuber. Accademia di Architettura di Mendrisio, Juni 2011 
 Raphael Zuber – Four Projects. Pelinu Books, Bukarest 2020

External links
 https://www.instagram.com/raphaelzuber/?hl=de
 http://www.raphaelzuber.com/index_d.html
 https://www.youtube.com/watch?v=I0mtpn5VDqY

References 

Living people
1973 births
Swiss architects